Sul Catarinense is a mesoregion in the Brazilian state of Santa Catarina.

Mesoregions of Santa Catarina (state)